57 Seconds is an upcoming American science fiction thriller film directed by Rusty Cundieff, written by Macon Blair, and starring Josh Hutcherson and Morgan Freeman.  It is based on the story "Fallen Angel" by Edwin Charles Tubb.  Freeman is also reported to have been "writing parts of the script."

Premise
Blogger Franklin Fausti thwarts an attack against Anton Burrell, a visionary tech guru he has been given a chance to interview. He finds a ring that Burrell dropped and discovers that it gives its wearer the ability to travel 57 seconds into the past. With Burrell's help, Franklin decides to use it to take revenge against the pharmaceutical company that was responsible for his sister's death.

Cast
Josh Hutcherson as Franklin Fausti
Morgan Freeman as Anton Burrell
Greg Germann
Lovie Simone
David Kallaway
Marcus Brown
Mandy Coussan
Bevin Bru
Kenneth Kynt Bryan
Sammi Rotibi
Mark Jacobson
Lucius Baston as Sammy
Matthew Jayson Cwern
Dickson Obahor
Aaron Jay Rome as Skinny Eddie
Marcus Lyle Brown as Kenn Bigg
Valerie Lamb as Hot Blonde
Jennifer Dent as Conference Attendee
Mary Drew Ahrens as Susan Miller
Allen Boudreaux as Security
Curtis Johnson as Security

Production
Filming began on April 11, 2022, in Lafayette, Louisiana.

The Acadiana Advocate reported that Freeman was reportedly seen in Lafayette in March 2022, allegedly scouting locations for the film.

References

External links
 

Upcoming films
American films about revenge
American science fiction thriller films
Films about journalists
Films about time travel
Films based on science fiction short stories
Films directed by Rusty Cundieff
Films produced by Gary Lucchesi
Films shot in Louisiana
Techno-thriller films
Upcoming English-language films